Hadfield is a surname. Notable people with the surname include:

Charles Hadfield (historian) (1909–1996), British canal historian
Charles Hadfield (journalist) (1821–1884), English journalist
Chris Hadfield (born 1959), Canadian astronaut
Darcy Hadfield (1889–1964), New Zealand rower
George Hadfield (architect) (1763–1826), American architect
George Hadfield (musician), member of This World Fair
George Hadfield (politician) (1787–1879), British politician
Isabel Hadfield (1893–1965), British physical chemist
James Hadfield (died 1841), failed British regicide
Jen Hadfield (born 1978), British poet and artist
John Hadfield (1907–1999), British writer
Jordan Hadfield (born 1987), English footballer
Matthew Ellison Hadfield (1812–1885), British architect
Octavius Hadfield (1814–1904), New Zealand Anglican missionary
Peter Hadfield (born 1955), Australian athlete
Peter Hadfield (journalist), YouTuber "Potholer54"
Robert Hadfield (1858–1940), British metallurgist
Ron Hadfield (1939–2013), British police officer
Tom Hadfield (born 1982), British businessman
Tom Hadfield (rugby league), New Zealand rugby footballer
Vic Hadfield (born 1940), Canadian ice hockey player

English-language surnames
English toponymic surnames
Surnames of English origin